The Busiyn-Gol ( or Бусэйн-Гол Buseyn-Gol) is a river in northern Mongolia and Tuva. It has its source in the southern Ulaan Taiga mountain range, meets the Russian border after about 50 km, and then follows the border north until its confluence with the Little Yenisey (Kyzyl-Khem).

References

See also
List of rivers of Mongolia

Rivers of Mongolia
Rivers of Tuva